Rudy Tirvengadum (born 16 January 1975) is a Mauritian sprinter. He competed in the men's 4 × 400 metres relay at the 1996 Summer Olympics.

References

External links
 

1975 births
Living people
Athletes (track and field) at the 1996 Summer Olympics
Mauritian male sprinters
Olympic athletes of Mauritius
Place of birth missing (living people)